Katherine 'Kate' Taaffe Richard is an American business woman and the founder of Warwick Investment Group, a private equity firm focused on real assets with approximately $2.3 billion in managed assets. Warwick Investment Group is a SEC-registered investment advisor, managing funds that invest globally in natural resources and real estate. Warwick has an established track record in strategic consolidation in these sectors, having completed more than 4,000 transactions since inception. The firm has ~75 team members and advisors in the US and Europe investing across private equity funds, special purpose vehicles and open-ended structures.

Early life and education

Richard's great uncle founded Devon Energy and drilled wells in the Caspian Sea following the fall of the Soviet Union.

Richard graduated in 2004 from Harvard College. Her academic focus was postcolonial theory, with a research focus on Rwanda.

Early career

After graduating from Harvard, she worked at Goldman Sachs as an investment banker and investor in the private equity division in New York, Paris, and London.

After leaving Goldman Sachs in 2007, Richard invested in public and private debt and equity of oil and gas and metals and mining companies, and in sovereign debt derivatives at Serengeti Asset Management in New York.

Richard left Serengeti in 2009 to invest in international and domestic energy companies for MSD Capital, Michael Dell’s private investment firm in New York.

Warwick Investment Group
Richard founded Warwick Investment Group in 2010. Warwick specializes in asset classes where it can provide differentiated returns across market cycles. The firm manages capital for institutional investors including pension funds, insurance companies, university endowments and foundations. 

Warwick has a large data science practice that specializes in econometrics, natural language processing, machine learning, network graph algorithms, on-chain analytics and multivariate geospatial, predictive, prescriptive and time series analytics.

Warwick's natural resources team specializes in acquiring and consolidating subsurface real estate. Warwick’s active discretionary funds, Warwick Partners III and Warwick Partners IV, seek to invest in cash flowing oil and gas assets while also developing low-break even inventory. Warwick partners with blue-chip operators and has its own operations team.

Warwick's real estate platform is focused on executing consolidation strategies in the cores of global cities with the potential for long-term capital appreciation across multiple real estate asset classes. Throughout 2021 and 2022, Warwick has acquired over 20 multifamily buildings across central London in the Mayfair and Belgravia neighborhoods.

In October 2021, The Wall Street Journal named Richard to the Private Equity 2021 Women to Watch List. She was the only founder of a private equity firm named in the group.

Other professional activities 
Richard has served on a number of boards and in a variety of advisory roles. She has previously served on the board of directors of Imerys, SA (Euronext Paris: NK), a Paris-based industrial conglomerate, Abraxas Petroleum Corp (NASDAQ: AXAS), and Flotek Industries, Inc. (NYSE: FTK). She has also advised the Islamic Republic of Afghanistan's Ministry of Mines on energy development and transparency. As of 2018 she was a member of the National Council of the American Enterprise Institute (AEI).

She has lectured at the Stanford Graduate School of Business, Harvard Business School, and the McCombs School of Business at the University of Texas.

Richard has appeared regularly on Bloomberg and is a regular contributor to CNBC's Power Lunch, Squawk Box and Crude Realities.

Additional affiliations include the US Humane Society, Young Presidents’ Organization (YPO), and US Figure Skating.  She is a lifetime member of the Harvard College ’04 Executive committee and the Harvard College Fund Associates Committee.

Awards and recognition
In January 2022, Warwick Investment Group CEO, Kate Richard, was featured as the cover story for NAPE magazine.

In October 2021, The Wall Street Journal named Warwick's CEO, Kate Richard to the Private Equity 2021 Women to Watch List and she was the only founder named in the group.

In February 2020, Warwick became a signatory of the UN-supported Principles for Responsible Investment.

In June 2019, Richard was selected as EY's Entrepreneur Of The Year 2019 Southwest Award for FinTech & Financial Services

In 2014, Oil & Gas Investor named her one of 20 Rising Stars in the Oil & Gas Industry Under 40. She also served as a judge for Forbes "30 Under 30 in Energy" award.

Richard represented the United States in 2013 as one of the World Economic Forum's Young Global Leaders and was a member of the Forum's Oil & Gas Agenda Council.

References

American women in business
American businesspeople
Living people
Year of birth missing (living people)
Harvard University alumni
Private equity
21st-century American women